Korlam Parvati Vara Prasada Rao, better known by his stage name Vizag Prasad, was a Telugu theatre artist actor known for his negative character artiste roles.

Career  
He started acting in plays at age 16. He acted in hundreds of plays before moving on to films. His first film was Babayi-Abbayi. The director of the film, Jandhyala, gave him the stage name "Vizag Prasad" to differentiate himself from the other actors with the stage name Prasad in the film. The stage name "Vizag Prasad" was derived from Prasad's birthplace, Gopalapuram, which is a suburb of Vizag. He made his Tamil debut in the film, Unnal Mudiyum Thambi, which was his only Tamil film to date. After a hiatus, he garnered acclaim for his role as Uday Kiran's father in Nuvvu Nenu in 2001. Nuvvu Nenu enabled him to be a viable supporting actor and he starred with well known Telugu actors in  Sundara Kanda, Allari Ramudu, Bhadra, Allari Bullodu, Gemeni, and Jai Chiranjeeva.

Plays 
He acted in over 700 plays including:
Appu Patram
 Bhale Pelli
 Bhajantreelu 
 Kaala Dharmam

Filmography 

1981 Ooruki Monagadu
1981 Mudda Mandaram
1985 Mogudu Pellalu 
1985 Pratighatana 
1985 Babayi-Abbayi
1987 Sruthilayalu 
1988 Unnal Mudiyum Thambi (Tamil)
1992 Sundarakanda
1993 Prema Pusthakam 
2001 Nuvvu Nenu
2002 Malli Malli Chudali
2002 Allari Ramudu
2002 Chennakesava Reddy
2002 Gemeni
2002 Ninu Choodaka Nenundalenu
2002 Kalusukovalani
2003 Juniors
2003 Idi Maa Ashokgadi Love Story
2003 Appudappudu
2003 Anaganaga O Kurraadu
2003 Janaki Weds Sriram
2004 Kedi No. 1
2004 Gowri
2004 Gudumba Shankar
2004 Pedababu
2005 Athanokkade
2005 Bhadra
2005 Political Rowdy
2005 Alex
2005 Allari Bullodu
2005 Jai Chiranjeeva
2006 Shock
2008 Sundarakanda 
2009 Fitting Master
2009 Bangaru Babu
2013 Masala
2014 Pilla Nuvvu Leni Jeevitham
2015 Lion
2017 Lovers Club
2018 Officer

Death 
He died in 2018 due to cardiac arrest.

References

External links
 
2018 deaths
Indian film actors
Male actors in Telugu cinema
Indian male film actors
Male actors from Visakhapatnam
20th-century Indian male actors
21st-century Indian male actors